Problepsis phoebearia is a moth of the family Geometridae described by Nikolay Grigoryevich Erschoff in 1870. It is found from north-eastern China to south-eastern Russia.

References

Moths described in 1870
Scopulini
Moths of Asia